Bandit corydoras or bandit cory is a common name shared by two similar but distinct species of fish:

Corydoras metae, also known as the masked corydoras, bandit catfish, or Meta River corydoras
Corydoras melini, also known as the false bandit catfish